The 2009 South American Under-17 Football Championship was an international football tournament held in Chile from April 17, 2009 to May 9, 2009. The ten national teams involved in the tournament were required to register a squad of 20 players; only players in these squads are eligible to take part in the tournament. Each player had to have been born after January 1, 1992.

Players name marked in bold have been capped at full international level.

Head coach: José Luis Brown

Head coach: Óscar Villegas

Head coach: Luiz Antônio Nizzo

Head coach: César Vaccia

Head coach: Ramiro Viáfara

Head coach: José Javier Rodríguez

Head coach: Jorge Campos

(N°1)Armando Andres Vera GK Libertad Paraguay 04/02/1993

Head coach: Juan José Oré

Head coach: Roland Marcenaro

Head coach: Daniel de Oliveira

References

2009 Squads